Xestaspis paulina is a species of spider of the genus Xestaspis. It is endemic to Sri Lanka.

See also
 List of Oonopidae species

References

Oonopidae
Endemic fauna of Sri Lanka
Arthropods of Sri Lanka
Spiders of Asia
Spiders described in 2012